Millidge may refer to:

 Millidge, Ontario, Canada
 Millidge (surname), a surname of British Isles origin

See also

 Milledge (disambiguation)